Joseph Schubert (20 December 1754 – 28 July 1837) was a German composer, violinist, and violist.

Schubert was born in Varnsdorf, Bohemia (now Czech Republic) to a musical family. He received his early musical education from his father, who was a cantor, and then in Prague. In 1778, he moved to Berlin to study the violin with Paul Kohn, director of the royal orchestra there.

In 1779, Schubert obtained a position as violinist in the court of Heinrich Friedrich, the Margrave of Brandenburg-Schwedt. In 1788, he accepted a post as violist in the court orchestra of Dresden, where he remained until his death in 1837.

Schubert gained recognition as a versatile composer, cited in the 1812 edition of Ernst Ludwig Gerber's lexicon of composers. His œuvre includes 15 masses, 4 operas, 17 sonatas, and 49 concertos for solo instruments. The Saxon State Library in Dresden holds the manuscripts of three viola concertos attributed to him.

Published works
Concerto for Viola and Orchestra in C major (Schott Music, ed. Karlheinz Schultz-Hauser)

External links
 biography (in German)
 

1754 births
1837 deaths
People from Varnsdorf
German Bohemian people
German opera composers
Male opera composers
German classical violinists
Male classical violinists
German violinists
German male violinists
German classical violists
German male classical composers